Santa Giulia may refer to:

People
Santa Giulia da Corsica (died ), Christian saint and martyr
 Santa Giulia Salzano (1846-1929), Italian Roman Catholic professed religious, canonized 2010

Places
 Milano Santa Giulia, a district of Milan, Italy
 Santa Giulia (Brescia), a monastery in Lombardy, Italy
 Santa Giulia, Lucca, a church

Ships
, a ship in service with Lugari & Filippi, Italy from 1962 to 1970